Mark Zimmermann (born 1 March 1974 in Bad Salzungen) is a former German footballer.

Career
From 19 to 25 September 2008, he was interim head coach in two matches (one win, one loss). The win was in the second round of the DFB-Pokal.

Managerial statistics

Honours
Carl Zeiss Jena
 Promotion to the Regionalliga Nord in 2004–05
 Promotion to the 2. Bundesliga in 1994–95 and 2005–06

SpVgg Unterhaching
 Promotion to the Bundesliga: 1998–99

References

1974 births
Living people
People from Bad Salzungen
People from Bezirk Suhl
German footballers
Footballers from Thuringia
German football managers
Bundesliga players
2. Bundesliga players
FC Carl Zeiss Jena players
SpVgg Unterhaching players
Alemannia Aachen players
FC Sachsen Leipzig players
Stuttgarter Kickers players
FC Carl Zeiss Jena managers
3. Liga managers
Association football forwards